"Looking Up" is a 2015 song by English musician Elton John, written by John and Bernie Taupin. It was released on 22 October 2015 as the first single for his 30th studio album Wonderful Crazy Night.

Background
John had simple instructions for Taupin, telling Rolling Stone, "I just said that I even wanted the slow songs to be optimistic. I wanted to make a happy record. 'Joyous' was the word I chose. Not happy, joyous. I said I want it to feel joyous from beginning to end, and even the slow songs should be joyous."

Music
"Looking Up" is written in A major and is an upbeat rock song with a positive vibe meant to bring light to balance out the darkness present in the world today.

Charts

Weekly charts

Year-end charts

References

 

2015 songs
Elton John songs
Songs with lyrics by Bernie Taupin
Songs with music by Elton John